The 1993 World Table Tennis Championships were held in Göteborg from May 11 to May 23, 1993.

Results

Team

Individual

References

External links
ITTF Museum

 
World Table Tennis Championships
World Table Tennis Championships
World Table Tennis Championships
Table tennis competitions in Sweden
Table
International sports competitions in Gothenburg
1990s in Gothenburg
May 1993 sports events in Europe